The 1984 United States Senate election in Illinois took place on November 6, 1984. Incumbent Republican Senator Charles H. Percy ran for re-election to a fourth term in the United States Senate. Senator Percy was opposed by Democratic nominee Paul Simon, who was a United States Congressman from Illinois's 22nd congressional district. The campaign between Percy and Simon was contentious and brutally-fought, and ended up with Simon ousting Percy by fewer than 90,000 votes, which was, at the time, considered an upset. Incidentally, Percy's son-in-law Jay Rockefeller was elected Senator from West Virginia in the same election cycle.

Election information
The election coincided with those for other federal offices (president and House), as well as state elections.

The primaries were held March 20.

Turnout
Turnout in the primaries was 36.67%, with a total of 2,219,583 votes cast.

Turnout in the general election was 73.99%, with 4,787,335 votes cast.

Democratic primary

Candidates
Roland Burris, Illinois State Comptroller
Philip J. Rock, State Senator from Oak Park 
Gerald M. Rose, member of the LaRouche movement
Alex Seith, nominee for Senate in 1978 and candidate in 1980
Paul Simon, U.S. Representative from Makanda

Results

Republican primary

Candidates
Richard J. Castic
Tom Corcoran, U.S. Representative from Ottawa
V. A. Kelley
Charles H. Percy, incumbent Senator since 1967
John E. Roche, candidate for Governor in 1982

Results

General election

Candidates
 Paul Simon (D), U.S. Representative from Illinois's 22nd congressional district
 Charles H. Percy (R), incumbent Senator
 Steve I. Givot (L)
 Marjorie H. Pries (I)
 Nelson Gonzalez (SW)
 Ishmael Flory (C)

Results
The election was very close. Simon prevailed by only 89,126 votes, or 1.86%. Incumbent Percy did well throughout the state, including the Chicago collar counties. However, in the heavily populated and Democratic Cook County, which encompasses the city of Chicago and the majority of the Chicago Metropolitan Area, Simon ran ahead of Percy by over 300,000 votes. Simon also won most counties in southwestern Illinois, a traditionally Democratic region. Percy led early on and well into the night, but as Cook County began to count all of its votes, Simon pulled ahead. Simon won despite then-president Reagan winning the state easily. Percy called Simon at around 5 A.M. the next day and conceded. Percy also congratulated Simon on his hard-earned victory. Simon was sworn in on January 3, 1985, and served in the Senate until January 3, 1997, when he retired. Simon was later succeeded by Dick Durbin, a close friend and fellow Democrat.

See also 
 1984 United States Senate elections

References

Illinois
1984
1984 Illinois elections